The M15 half-track, officially designated M15 Combination Gun Motor Carriage,  was a self-propelled anti-aircraft gun on a half-track chassis used by the United States Army during World War II. It was equipped with one M1 automatic 37 millimeter (1.5 in) gun and two water-cooled .50 caliber (12.7 mm) M2 Browning heavy machine guns. Based on the M3 half-track chassis, it was produced by the White Motor Company and Autocar between July 1942 and February 1944, and served alongside the M16 Multiple Gun Motor Carriage.

The M15 evolved from the T28 project, an outgrowth of a 37 millimeter (1.5 in) gun mounted on an M2 half-track. Initially designated as the T28E1 Combination Gun Motor Carriage (CGMC), it was accepted into service in 1943 as the M15. While conceived as an anti-aircraft weapon, its 37 mm gun was often used as an infantry support weapon during the later stages of World War II. The M15A1 was an improved variant with air-cooled machine guns mounted below the 37 mm gun. The M15 "Special" was an M15 armed with a single Bofors 40 mm gun.

During World War II, the vehicle served the U.S. Army throughout the Mediterranean, European, and Pacific theaters of operations. In the Korean War, the M15 served alongside the M16 providing infantry support.

Specifications
The M15 was based on the M3 half-track chassis, adding a coaxially mounted armament of a fully automatic M1  gun and two superior-placed .50-caliber (12.7 mm) M2 Browning machine guns. The suspension was leaf spring on the front axle and vertical volute spring for the tracks.

Development

The M15 design developed from the United States Army Coast Artillery Corps' T1A2 Multiple Gun Motor Carriage (MGMC) project, which added a 37-mm gun to an M2 half-track car. It was designated the T28 and tested at the Aberdeen Proving Grounds. The tests were deemed unsuccessful due to heavy recoil, and the project was canceled in 1942.

T28E1
A United States Army Armored Force requirement for a mobile anti-aircraft gun to support the coming North African Campaign resulted in the T28 project being revived soon after its cancellation. The new vehicles used the larger M3 half-track chassis and an M2E1 sight for target spotting, receiving the designation T28E1 Combination Gun Motor Carriage (CGMC).

A total of eighty T28E1s were produced from July to August 1942 by White, all of which had a mount lacking protection for the gun combination and crew. After this initial run the vehicle gained an armored mount and went into production as the M15 CGMC. Some of the T28E1s still in service had their 37 mm guns removed and were converted into M3A1 half-tracks.

M15, M15A1, M15 "Special"

The M15 was equipped with the M42 armored weapon mount, with two water-cooled coaxial M2 Browning machine guns above a 37 mm gun. A total of 680 M15s were produced in 1943 by White and Autocar before the considerable stress this mount placed on the M3 chassis resulted in its replacement with the M54 mount. The new mount reversed weapon placement, used simpler and lighter air-cooled M2 Brownings, and added a M6 sighting system.

The resulting combination of the M54 mount with the M3A1 half-track chassis was designated the M15A1 CGMC. A total of 1,052 were produced in 1943, and a further 600 in 1944. 100 M15s were shipped to the Soviet Union under the Lend-Lease policy. Both the M42 mount and M15 CGMC were classified as obsolete in August 1946.

The M15 "Special" was the unofficial name for an M15 (and probably other CGMCs) adapted in depots in Australia to carry only a single Bofors 40 mm gun. To enhance ground support firepower during the Korean War, depots in Japan were searched for vehicles that could be refurbished for possible combat use. A shortage of 37 mm ammunition and relative abundance of 40 mm ammunition resulted in conversion of some M15s into "T19s", later officially designated model M34.

Service history

The M15 was first used during Operation Torch, the November 1942 Anglo-American invasion of North Africa. Tracer ammunition from the machine guns was used to bring the main gun onto the target when engaging enemy aircraft. T28E1 crews shot down more than a hundred aircraft during Operation Torch, the Battle of Kasserine Pass, and the Allied Invasion of Sicily, shooting down thirty-nine at Kasserine alone. One T28E1 was captured at Kasserine by the Germans and rebuilt as an equipment and troop carrier to replace vehicles destroyed by Allied aircraft. During the Allied Invasion of Sicily, 78 T28E1s helped provide anti-aircraft fire for the invasion force. They were especially effective against low-flying aircraft, like Stuka dive bombers. T28E1s were used in Italy until the end of the war.

Each US Army armored division was allocated an anti-aircraft artillery (AAA) battalion of four companies, each equipped with eight M15 CGMCs and eight M45 Quadmount-equipped M16 MGMCs. At corps and army level, each AAA battalion was equipped with thirty-two of each vehicle. After first seeing action in the Allied invasion of Italy, the M15 and M15A1 served through the rest of the Italian Campaign, the Allied invasion of Normandy, Operation Dragoon in southern France, and throughout the fighting on the Western Front. They were often used in ground support roles, as Allied air superiority left few German aircraft to engage. The vehicles were also used in the Pacific Theater during the campaign to liberate the Philippines and during the Battle of Okinawa. The M15 "Special" was used by the 209th AAA Battalion in the Philippines from 1944 to 1945.

The M15 and M15A1 served in a ground-support role during the Korean War. The M34 (instead of the M15A1, which was then classified as "limited standard") served with several AAA battalions there, including the 76th AAA Battalion and the 140th AAA Battalion. Several M15 "Specials" managed to avoid being scrapped in the post-war period and were also used, along with those converted in Japan. After World War II, many M15s were provided to Japan under the Military Aid Program (MAP). At least 20 were sent to Yugoslavia during the Informbiro period.

See also

 M45 Quadmount
 List of U.S. military vehicles by model number
 List of U.S. military vehicles by supply catalog designation
 Sd.Kfz. 251, equivalent German half-track

References

Sources

Journals

  (including "cover artwork")

Further reading

 

Half-tracks of the United States
World War II armored fighting vehicles of the United States
World War II half-tracks
Self-propelled anti-aircraft weapons of the United States
Military vehicles introduced from 1940 to 1944